The Fujita Piano Trio is a piano trio consisting of three Japanese sisters,  (violinist),  (cellist), and  (pianist).

Early years
The sisters began playing chamber music together since early childhood. Arisa and Honoka studied at the Guildhall School of Music and Drama, London, and Megumi at the Yehudi Menuhin School and the Royal College of Music, London.

The trio received coaching from David Takeno and the Takács Quartet. They won the Chamber Music Prize at the Guildhall School in 1994.

Career
They debuted at the Wigmore Hall in London in March 1999, which launched their career. The trio has performed in the UK and overseas.

The trio was awarded the 2007 Kyoto Aoyama Barocksaal Prize.

Discography
Takemitsu Between Tides etc ASV1120 2001
Tchaikovsky Piano Trio etc  Intim Musik IMCD 085 2003
Eugène Ysaÿe Six Sonatas for Solo Violin Op.27 Intim Music IMCD 092 2005
Rachmaninov 24 Preludes for Piano Intim Music IMCD 097 2005
Ravel/Shostakovich Piano Trios Intim Music IMCD 104  2006
Schubert Piano Trios Intim Musik IMCD 108 2007
Dvořák/Smetana Piano Trios Intim Musik IMCD 112 2009
Beethoven/Ravel/Rachmaninov Piano Solos Intim Musik IMCD 114 2009

References

External links
 
 Website at Neil Chaffey Concert Promotions
 List of recordings on the Intim Musik label
 Takemitsu disc on ASV Records
 Arisa Fujita (Guildhall School of Music and Drama)

Japanese classical musicians
Alumni of the Guildhall School of Music and Drama
Alumni of the Royal College of Music
People educated at Yehudi Menuhin School
Piano trios